Élder Santana Conceição (born 7 April 1993) is a Brazilian professional footballer who plays as a forward for the Kazakhstani club Aktobe.

Professional career
Santana began his senior career with Morrinhos, and moved to Atlético Mineiro in 2013. He made his professional debut with Atlético Mineiro in a 4–1 Campeonato Brasileiro Série A loss to Cruzeiro on 27 July 2013. He then had stints with the Brazilian clubs Tupi, Ferroviária, and RB Bragantino before returning to Atlético Mineiro in 2017. Santana moved to Portugal in 2019 with Sanjoanense, and on 25 June 2021 moved to the Primeira Liga club Gil Vicente.

On 10 February 2023, Santana joined Aktobe in Kazakhstan.

References

External links
 
 

1993 births
Footballers from São Paulo (state)
Living people
Brazilian footballers
Association football forwards
Clube Atlético Mineiro players
Tupi Football Club players
Associação Ferroviária de Esportes players
Red Bull Bragantino players
Atlético Clube Goianiense players
Botafogo Futebol Clube (SP) players
Sertãozinho Futebol Clube players
A.D. Sanjoanense players
Gil Vicente F.C. players
FC Aktobe players
Campeonato Brasileiro Série A players
Campeonato Brasileiro Série B players
Campeonato Brasileiro Série C players
Campeonato de Portugal (league) players
Primeira Liga players
Brazilian expatriate footballers
Brazilian expatriate sportspeople in Portugal
Expatriate footballers in Portugal
Brazilian expatriate sportspeople in Kazakhstan
Expatriate footballers in Kazakhstan